Grundy Lake Provincial Park is a natural environment park in Ontario, Canada, established in 1959, and part of the Ontario Parks system.  The park is located near Britt, at the junction of Highway 69 and Highway 522.

Walking trails include sections of boardwalk. Wildlife includes great blue herons and on the geology front there are rocks from the precambrian shield.

References

External links
 
 

Provincial parks of Ontario
Protected areas established in 1959
1959 establishments in Ontario